Walgreen may refer to:

 Charles Rudolph Walgreen
 Charles Rudolph Walgreen Jr.
 Walgreens Boots Alliance Holding company 
 The Walgreens, aka The Walgreen Company (WAG)
 Walgreens Health Services (WHS), a business unit of Walgreens
 Walgreen Drug Store (Miami, Florida)
 The Walgreen Coast, a portion of the coast of Antarctica

See also
 Wahlgren (disambiguation)